This is a list of foreign players in the Kategoria Superiore, which commenced play in 1930. The following players must meet both of the following two criteria:
Have played at least one Kategoria Superiore game. Players who were signed by Kategoria Superiore clubs, but only played in lower league, cup and/or European games, or did not play in any competitive games at all, are not included.
Are considered foreign, i.e., outside Kategoria Superiore determined by the following:
A player is considered foreign if his allegiance is not to play for the national team of Albania.
More specifically,
If a player has been capped on international level, the national team is used; if he has been capped by more than one country, the highest level (or the most recent) team is used. These include Albanian players with dual citizenship.
If a player has not been capped on international level, his country of birth is used, except those who were born abroad from Albanian parents or moved to Albania at a young age, and those who clearly indicated to have switched his nationality to another nation.

Clubs listed are those for which the player has played at least one Kategoria Superiore game — and seasons are those in which the player has played at least one Premier League game. Note that seasons, not calendar years, are used. For example, "1992–95" indicates that the player has played in every season from 1992–93 to 1994–95, but not necessarily every calendar year from 1992 to 1995. Therefore, a player should always have a listing under at least two years — for instance, a player making his debut in 2011, during the 2011–12 season, will have '2011–12' after his name. This follows general practice in expressing sporting seasons in Albania.

In bold: players who have played at least one Kategoria Superiore game in the current season (2021–22), and are still at a club for which they have played. This does not include current players of a Kategoria Superiore club who have not played a Kategoria Superiore game in the current season.

Details correct as of 11 January 2022

Andorra  
Sergi Moreno – Vllaznia – 2011–12

Angola  
Pedro Bengui – Luftëtari — 2016–17
Silas Daniel Satonho — Luftëtari — 2016–17

Argentina  

Miguel Barreto — Dinamo Tirana — 2004–05
Daniel Alejandro Bertoya — Dinamo Tirana — 2008–09
Nicolas Bosoletti — Dinamo Tirana — 2004–05
Diego Celis — Bylis — 2019–20
Pablo Cabañas — Dinamo Tirana — 2002–03
Cristian Andrés Campozano — Dinamo Tirana — 2008–09
Alejandro Carrusca — Vllaznia — 2008–09
Rubén Cecco — Dinamo Tirana — 2008–09
Franco Cingolani — Dinamo Tirana — 2004–05
Martín Dedyn — Tërbuni — 2015–16
Nicolás Delmonte — Dinamo Tirana — 2009–10
Leandro Escudero — Dinamo Tirana — 2005–06
Daniel Fernández — Dinamo Tirana — 2002–03
Alejandro Frezzotti — Dinamo Tirana — 2004–05
Esteban García — Dinamo Tirana — 2010–11
Federico Haberkorn Dinamo Tirana — 2015–16
Sebastián Ibars — Flamurtari — 2019–20
Mario Kempes — Lushnja — 1996–97
Héctor David Ledesma — Dinamo Tirana — 2004–05
Lucas Malacarne — Dinamo Tirana, Kastrioti, Kukësi — 2009–14
Nestor Martinena — Dinamo Tirana, Kamza — 2010–11, 2018–19
Néstor Moiraghi — Dinamo Tirana — 2004–05
Fabián Muñoz — Bylis — 2019–20
Hours Alejandro Palladino — Dinamo Tirana — 2008–09
Miguel Eduardo Prado — Dinamo Tirana — 2002–03
Mario Antonio Romero — Dinamo Tirana — 2008–09
Alfredo Rafael Sosa — Dinamo Tirana, Skënderbeu, Flamurtari, Laçi — 2009–11, 2012–13, 2014–15
Agustín González Tapia — Dinamo Tirana — 2008–09
Maximiliano Timpanaro — Dinamo Tirana — 2009–10
Agustín Torassa — Partizani, Flamurtari, Tirana — 2015–17, 2018–21
Juan Manuel Varea — Bylis — 2015–16
Oscar Luis Vera — Dinamo Tirana — 2004–05
Pablo Lorenzo Vittori — Dinamo Tirana — 2002–03
Daniel Zaccanti — Tirana, Shkumbini, Dinamo Tirana — 2002–04
Walter Zermatten — Dinamo Tirana — 2004–05
Angel Gonzalez Zuluaga — Bylis — 2019–20

Australia  
Melos Bajrami — Skënderbeu — 2020–
Labinot Haliti — Teuta — 2007–08
Goce Petrovski — Besëlidhja — 2007–08

Austria  

Albin Gashi — Kukësi — 2020–22
Ronald Gërçaliu — Tirana — 2015–16
Mehdi Hetemaj — Kukësi — 2020–21
Butrint Vishaj — Skënderbeu, Kastrioti — 2010–12

Azerbaijan  
Eltun Turabov — Bylis — 2019–20

Bahamas  
Cameron Hepple — Tirana — 2011–12

Bahrain  
Mahmood Al-Ajmi — Tirana — 2011–12

Belgium  
Kristi Kullaj — Partizani — 2021–
Marvin Ogunjimi — Skënderbeu — 2016–17
Donjet Shkodra – Flamurtari, Skënderbeu, Kukësi — 2016–19
Sebastjan Spahiu — Laçi — 2021–

Benin  
Félicien Singbo — Vllaznia — 2004–05

Bolivia  
Augusto Andaveris — Tirana — 2005–06
Percy Colque — Tirana — 2005–06

Bosnia and Herzegovina  

Semir Bajraktarević — Flamurtari — 2019–20
Anel Dedić — Teuta — 2017–18
Haris Dilaver — Vllaznia — 2020–21
Edin Ferizović – Apolonia 2009, Shkumbini 2010, Besa 2010
Renato Gojković — Partizani — 2017–19
Aldin Gurdijeljac – Shkumbini (2011)
Sead Hadžibulić – Apolonia (2009–2010), Dinamo Tirana (2009), Vllaznia (2010), Laçi (2010), Besa (2010)
Semir Hadžibulić  — Apolonia, Gramozi, Besa, Vllaznia — 2008–2011, 2015–16
Nedim Halilović — Dinamo Tirana — 2008–09
Haris Harba — Kukësi, Bylis — 2018–19, 2020–21
Elvedin Herić — Vllaznia — 2021–
Kenan Horić — Kukësi — 2020–21
Kenan Hreljić — Teuta — 2019–20
Ferid Idrizović — Teuta (2006)
Nemanja Janičić — Luftëtari — 2018–19
Igor Joksimović – Shkumbini (2009)
Ivan Jolić — Skënderbeu — 2010–11
Mladen Kukrika – Kastrioti (2014)
Numan Kurdić — Kukësi — 2020–21
Bojan Marković – Teuta (2017)
Vlado Marković — Skënderbeu, Teuta — 2009–12
Dragan Mićić – Besëlidhja (2007–2008)
Ahmed Mujdragić – Shkumbini (2008–2011)
Adin Mulaosmanović – Elbasani (2007)
Zinedin Mustedanagić — Vllaznia — 2021–
Almir Pliska – Partizani (2014)
Nihad Šero — Bylis — 2020–21
Bojan Vučinić – Dinamo Tirana (2002–2003)
Mladen Žižović – Tirana (2010–2011)

Botswana  
Robert Maposa Simione — Skënderbeu — 2007–18

Brazil  

Abílio – Partizani (2002–2004), Vllaznia (2004–2005)
Renato Abonicio – Teuta (2002–2003)
Ademir – Skënderbeu (2012–2016), Laçi (2016)
Adenilson – Partizani (2001–2004), Apolonia (2006–2007)
Leonel Adriano – Vllaznia (2002–2003), Elbasani (2003–2004), Partizani (2004–2005)
Bruno Agnello – Laçi (2016–2017)
Bruno Aquino – Laçi (2016)
Luis Fernando Alex – Vllaznia (2004–2005)
Allisson – Kukësi (2015)
Danilo Alves — Flamurtari — 2015–19
Bruno Arrabal – Kamza (2017–)
Marco Aurélio — Luftëtari — 2017–18
Bruno Barbosa – Partizani (2008)
Robson Barbosa – Partizani (2008)
Sandro Barbosa – Apolonia (2002–2003)
Bernardo Barbosa Carvalho – Partizani (2004–2005)
Breno Basso – Partizani (2008)
Marcos Berdague – Flamurtari (1996–1997)
Jhonatan Bernardo – Teuta (2016)
Birungueta – Kukësi (2015)
Marcelo Brachini – Partizani (2002–2004), Egnatia (2005–2006)
Elton Calé — Kukësi, Flamurtari, Tirana — 2016–21
Ronaille Calheira – Bylis (2015)
Lucas Caniggia – Flamurtari (2016–)
Alan Cardec – Partizani (2005–2006)
Lucas Cardoso — Partizani — 2018–22
Antonio Carioca – Partizani (2001–2004)
Felipe Carioca – Partizani (2008)
Jean Carioca – Kukësi (2015–)
Cassius Vinicius Coelho — Vllaznia — 2020–21
Renato Coelho – Besa (2003–2004)
William Cordeiro — Kukësi, Partizani — 2018–21
Devid — Kastrioti, Tirana — 2020–
Douglas – Flamurtari (2014)
Djair – Skënderbeu (2015)
Edmílson – Bylis (2016)
Edu – Lushnja (1996–1997)
Guilherme Eller – Egnatia – 2021–
Erasmo – Vllaznia (2002–2003)
Maicón Esquerda — Laçi — 2016–18
Esquerdinha – Skënderbeu (2015–2016)
Vitor Feijão — Kukësi — 2021–
Fernandinho — Partizani — 2021–
Fernando – Skënderbeu (2013)
Júnior Ferrim – Partizani (2004–2006)
Flávio – Flamurtari (2007–2009)
Erick Flores – Kukësi (2015–2016)
Cate Fonseca – Luftëtari (2013), Kastrioti (2013), Lushnja (2014)
Formiga – Shkumbini (2002–2003), Partizani (2005)
Gilberto Fortunato – Tirana (2014, 2015), Flamurtari (2014)
Gabriel – Partizani (2016)
Washington Galvão – Apolonia (2007–2008)
Alexandre Cardoso Garcia — Bylis — 2020–21
Geraldinho – Partizani (2001–2003), Lushnja (2003–2004), Vllaznia (2005–2006), Apolonia (2006–2007)
Gigante — Vllaznia — 2021–22
Giovanni – Teuta (1999–2001)
Filipe Gomes – Partizani (2016)
Leandro Gomes – Vllaznia (2005–2006)
Semião Granado – Kukësi (2015)
Philippe Guimarães – Kukësi (2016)
Alan Henrique — Bylis — 2020–21
Carlos Henrique – Flamurtari (2020–)
João Henrique – Flamurtari (2016)
Felipe Hereda – Kukësi (2016)
Hugo — Teuta — 2017–18
Hugo – Tirana (2016)
Hygor — Vllaznia — 2019–20
Jackson, born 1991 — Luftëtari, Teuta — 2018–19, 2020–
Jackson, born 1999 – Egnatia – 2021–
Jefferson – Kukësi (2014–2015)
Jildemar – Teuta (2016)
Victor Juffo — Flamurtari — 2017–18
Juliano – Kukësi (2015)
Iran Junior — Teuta — 2020–21
Stênio Júnior — Partizani — 2020–
Juriander – Partizani (2005–2006), Shkumbini (2006), Gramozi (2008–2011)
Marcelo Júnior – Partizani (2001–2002)
Kaina — Vllaznia, Kastrioti — 2021–
Rafael Leandro – Teuta (2014)
Matheus Leiria — Kukësi — 2020–21
Léo Lelis — Kamza — 2016–18
Leomir – Kukësi (2015)
Mateus Lima – Kukësi (2015–2016)
Joner Lopez – Partizani (2004–2005)
Lorran — Bylis — 2020–21
Lynneeker – Flamurtari (2017–)
Maranhão, born 1992 — Vllaznia — 2019–20
Maranhão, born 1995 — Dinamo Tirana — 2021–
Neto Marcolino — Bylis — 2020–21
Marconi – Skënderbeu (2014)
Dhiego Martins – Skënderbeu (2014–2015)
Leonardo Martins – Gramozi (2008–2011)
Mauricio – Elbasani (2014)
Maurício – Flamurtari (2017–)
Moraes Jr. — Kastrioti, Skënderbeu — 2020–
Felipe Moreira – Kukësi (2015–)
Marco Morgon — Bylis — 2020–21
Rodrigo do Nascimento – Partizani (2003, 2005–2006)
Jean Neves – Apolonia (2007–2009)
Índio Oliveira — Flamurtari — 2019–
Fernando Paulinho – Besëlidhja (2008)
Pedro – Egnatia – 2021–
Pericles – Kukësi (2014–2015), Laçi (2016)
Márcio Pit – Kukësi (2015)
Lucas Ramos — Flamurtari, Laçi — 2019–21
Rangel – Kukësi (2016–2017)
Williams Recife – Kukësi (2016)
Renatinho – Skënderbeu (2016)
Renato – Apolonia (2006)
Aluidi Ribeiro – Apolonia (2006)
Bernardo Ribeiro – Skënderbeu (2011–2012)
Rinaldo – Vllaznia (2005)
Paulo Júnior — Skënderbeu — 2021–
Paulo Roberto – Flamurtari (2007)
Roger — Kukësi, Kastrioti — 2018–19
Mauricio José Rodriguez – Partizani (2004), Dinamo Tirana (2005)
Roma – Partizani (2008)
Murilo Rosa — Skënderbeu — 2021–22
Marko dos Santos – Apolonia (2003–2005), Gramozi (2006–2010), Besa (2010–2011)
Wilson dos Santos – Apolonia (2002–2003, 2006)
Serginho — Skënderbeu, Laçi — 2016–20
Denis Silva – Bylis (2010–2013), Skënderbeu (2012), Kastrioti (2013–2014)
Denisson Silva — Dinamo Tirana — 2021–
Leandro da Silva – Dinamo Tirana (2003–2006), Vllaznia (2007–2008), Partizani (2006–2007), Gramozi (2008–2009)
Luiz da Silva – Apolonia (2011), Teuta (2012–2014)
Victor da Silva — Vllaznia — 2020–
Sílvio — Vllaznia — 2018–20
Emerson Sinho — Vllaznia — 2019–20
Stênio — Laçi — 2019–20
Taubaté – Laçi (2016)
Teco — Laçi — 2019–21
Leandro Teófilo – Vllaznia (2009)
Joseta de Trinidade – Partizani (2005)
Tuxa — Flamurtari — 2019–
Enric Vale – Vllaznia (2004–2005)
Vicente — Bylis — 2019–20
Jean Victor — Skënderbeu — 2020–
Vlademir – Lushnja (1996–1997)
Welder — Flamurtari — 2019–20
Wéverton – Kukësi (2016–)
Wilker – Tërbuni (2016)
Alex Willian – Tirana (2016)

Bulgaria  

Sasho Angelov – Flamurtari (2002)
Nikolay Arabov – Tirana (1992–1993)
G. Bosceski – Apolonia (2001–2002)
Yuri Dimitrov – Apolonia (2001–2002)
Ignat Dishliev – Partizani (2014)
Dragomir Draganov – Flamurtari (2011)
Konstantin Gerganchev – Apolonia (2000–2002)
Ventsislav Hristov — Skënderbeu — 2015–16
Angel Iliev – Flamurtari (2002)
Martin Kavdanski – Tirana (2015)
Martin Kerchev – Teuta (2011)
Mario Kirev — Kamza — 2018–19
Miroslav Mindev – Lushnja (2003–2004)
Radostin Rusev – Apolonia (2001–2002)

Burkina Faso  
Moussa Kaboré — Bylis — 2008–09

Burundi  
Selemani Ndikumana – Tirana (2014–2015)

Cameroon  

Patrice Abanda – Besa (2006–2007)
Mohamadolu Abdouraman – Shkumbini (2006–2007), Bylis (2007–2009)
Michael Ajegba – Elbasani (2003), Flamurtari (2004)
Mengbwa Akamba – Shkumbini (2005–2006), Elbasani (2006–2007), Skënderbeu (2008)
Manuel Bikoula – Besa (2005–2009)
Malek Binogol – Besa (2006–2007), Kastrioti (2007)
Pierre Boya – Kukësi (2014)
Edy-Nicolas Boyom — Luftëtari, Kastrioti — 2016–17, 2018–19, 2020–21
Moustapha Djidjiwa – Partizani (2017)
Timothe Ebanda – Besa (2006–2007)
François Endene – Besa (2006–2008)
Essama Etogo – Tirana (2011)
Anicet Eyenga – Elbasani (2006)
Steeve Gerard Fankà – Luftëtari (2012)
Abade Narcisse Fish – Tirana (2006–2007), Flamurtari (2007–2008)
Alain N'Koulou – Flamurtari (2006)
Guy Madjo – Bylis (2010)
Emmanuel Mbella – Bylis (2015–2016)
Roger Pandong – Skënderbeu (2005–2006, 2008), Flamurtari (2006), Luftëtari (2007)
Ghislain Taviko – Luftëtari (2006–2007), Vllaznia (2007)
Bernard Tchoutang – Elbasani (2007)
Michel Vaillant – Bylis (2019)
Jean Paul Yontcha – Elbasani (2015)
Tabort Etaka Preston – Kastrioti (2018)

Canada  
Romedi Llapi — Flamurtari — 2018–20

Cape Verde  
José Semedo — Tirana — 2013–14

Chile  
Sebastián Toro — Laçi — 2018–19

Colombia  
Andrés Montero – Luftëtari (2016)
Diómedes Peña – Tirana (2005–2006)
Carlos Robles Rocha – Partizani (2015–2016)

Congo  
Richard Bokatola – Vllaznia (2002–2006), Partizani (2006), Flamurtari (2006–2007), Kastrioti (2007), Elbasani (2008), Lushnja (2008–2009)
Dzon Delarge – Egnatia – 2021–
Herby Fortunat – Besa 2005–2006, 2007–2009, Tirana (2013)
Kévin Koubemba – Teuta – 2021–22
Chandrel Massanga — Partizani — 2021–
Merveille Ndockyt — Tirana — 2016–17
Moise Nkounkou — Tirana — 2016–17
Lionel Samba — Bylis — 2020–21

Croatia  

Robert Alviz – Flamurtari (2008–2009), Kastrioti (2010–2011)
Ante Aralica — Vllaznia — 2021–
Ivan Babić – Kastrioti (2010–2011)
Boris Baković – Kastrioti (2010)
Matej Bagarić – Laçi (2015)
Edi Baša — Kukësi — 2021–
Marko Bašić – Vllaznia (2008–2009), Flamurtari (2009), Kastrioti (2011)
Mario Bilen – Flamurtari (2010)
Luko Biskup – Skënderbeu (2010–2012), Kukësi (2012–2013)
Boris Bjelkanović – Lushnja (2013–2014)
Dario Bodrušić – Dinamo Tirana (2007-2009)
Goran Brajković – Flarmurtari (2008-2009)
Mate Brajković – Flarmurtari (2007)
Davor Bratić – Skënderbeu (2010–2012), Flamurtari (2012–2013), Kukësi (2013)
Hrvoje Bukovski — Luftëtari — 2018–19
Stipe Buljan — Laçi — 2010–16
Tomislav Bušić — Vllaznia, Tirana, Flamurtari, Teuta — 2013–15, 2016–19
Marin Con – Flamurtari (2008-2009)
Kristijan Čaval – Dinamo Tirana (2005-2006)
Anton Dedaj – Flarmurtari (2007-2008)
Matko Djarmati – Skënderbeu (2009), Kastrioti (2010), Besa (2011), Dinamo Tirana (2011–2012)
Duško Dukić – Bylis (2016), Korabi (2016)
Antun Dunković – Partizani (2014)
Matija Dvorneković – Kukësi (2016–2017)
Nikola Eller — Laçi — 2018–19
Andrija Filipović — Partizani — 2021–22
Ivan Fuštar – Flamurtari (2015)
Ivan Galić — Flamurtari, Laçi — 2016–17, 2018–19
Vedran Gerc – Tirana (2013)
Dejan Godar – Bylis (2009)
Goran Granić – Dinamo Tirana (2007-2009)
Damir Grgić — Kastrioti — 2021–22
Ante Hrkać — Teuta — 2017–18
Danijel Hrman – Tirana (2007)
Ivan Jovanović – Tërbuni (2016)
Pëllumb Jusufi – Dinamo Tirana (2008-2009), Kastrioti (2009-2010), Tomori (2012)
Zoran Kastel – Dinamo Tirana (2005-2007)
Lek Kćira – Tirana (2008-2009)
Vice Kendeš — Laçi — 2018–19
Saša Maras – Erzeni (2001-2003)
Mario Mijatović – Kukësi (2016)
Marin Mudrazija — Kastrioti — 2021–22
Branko Panić – Flamurtari (2007-2009)
Pero Pejić – Dinamo Tirana (2007–2008), Tirana (2010–2011), Flamurtari (2012), Skënderbeu (2012–2014), Kukësi (2014–2015, 2016–2017)
Darko Perić – Elbasani (2006-2007)
Marko Pervan — Skënderbeu — 2018–19
Frane Petričević – Dinamo Tirana (2008-2009)
Toni Pezo – Tirana (2008–2009), Flamurtari (2012–2013)
Mirko Plantić – Vllaznia (2009)
Marko Radaš — Skënderbeu, Laçi — 2011–19
Mario Sačer – Partizani (2014)
Dino Špehar — Kukësi — 2018–19
Željko Tomić – Skënderbeu (2012–2014)
Mario Vasilj — Apolonia — 2020–21
Domagoj Verhas – Dinamo Tirana (2005-2006)
Goran Vinčetić – Dinamo Tirana (2005-2008)
Ivor Weitzer — Vllaznia — 2016–17
Filip Žderić — Kukësi — 2017–18

Cuba  

Joel Apezteguía — Teuta — 2012–13

Czech Republic  
Miloslav Kousal – Vllaznia (2008–2009)
Petr Trapp – Flamurtari (2015)

DR Congo  
Archi Fataki – Kastrioti (2012–2013), Lushnja (2013)
Landry Mulemo — Vllaznia — 2016–17
Delain Sasa – Vllaznia (2001–2002, 2007–2008), Partizani (2003, 2005–2006), Flamurtari (2006–2007), Bylis (2008)

Egypt  
Mohamed El-Ghazllan — Tirana — 2001–02
Hassan Nasr — Tirana — 2001–02

El Salvador  
Roberto Domínguez — Partizani — 2020–21

England  

Michael Ngoo — Tirana — 2018–20, 2021–
Jamie Phoenix – Vllaznia, Bylis, Luftëtari — 2009–11, 2012–13

Ethiopia  
Beneyam Demte — Skënderbeu — 2017–19

Finland  
Kevin Mombilo — Partizani — 2018–19
Lum Rexhepi — Partizani — 2018–19
Tim Väyrynen — Tirana — 2020–21

France  
Addnane El Archi – Bylis (2009)
Abdelaye Diakité – Bylis (2015)
Chris Gadi – Egnatia – 2021–22
Arnaud Guedj — Skënderbeu — 2018–19
Ardian Krasniqi — Teuta — 2017–18
Laurent Mohellebi – Tirana (2008–2009)
Mickaël Panos — Vllaznia — 2021–
Chafik Tigroudja — Kukësi — 2018–19

Gabon 
Georges Ambourouet – Dinamo Tirana (2010–2011)
Romuald Ntsitsigui – Tirana (2016–)

Gambia  

Ismaila Jagne — Teuta, Skënderbeu — 2007–08
Tijan Jaiteh — Partizani — 2018–19
Fallou Njie — Skënderbeu — 2020–21
Ali Sowe — Skënderbeu — 2017–18

Georgia  
Irakli Dzaria — Kukësi — 2017–19
Nikoloz Gelashvili – Flamurtari (2014)
Giorgi Popkhadze – Flamurtari (2015)
Mate Tsintsadze — Kukësi — 2020–21
Bachana Tskhadadze – Flamurtari (2015)

Germany  
Tim Brdarić — Vllaznia — 2020–21
Gertian Durishti – Vllaznia (2006–2007)
Ndriqim Halili – Kukësi (2015)
Engjëll Hoti — Tirana — 2021–
Steven Kodra — Laçi — 2020–21
Vesel Limaj — Kukësi, Tirana — 2017–
Christopher Mandiangu — Vllaznia — 2020–21
Bajram Nebihi — Flamurtari — 2019–20
Mërgim Neziri – Kamza (2017), Luftëtari — 2017–18, 2018–19
Lutz Pfannenstiel – Vllaznia (2006–2007)
Daniel Sengewald – Partizani (2006–2007)

Ghana  

Seth Ablade — Elbasani — 2003–04
Reuben Acquah – Teuta – 2021–
Michael Agbekpornu – Egnatia – 2021–
Abbey Agbodzie — Skënderbeu — 2020–
Benjamin Agyare — Apolonia — 2020–21
Latif Amadu — Teuta — 2017–19
Jakob Apuary – Egnatia (2004–2005)
Samuel Armah — Skënderbeu — 2020–21
Bernard Arthur — Apolonia — 2020–21
Vincent Atinga — Tirana — 2018–19
Charles Atsina — Vllaznia, Kastrioti — 2017–19
Ngissah Bismark — Skënderbeu — 2021–22
James Boadu – Vllaznia (2008–2009)
Winful Cobbinah — Tirana — 2018–20
Richard Danso — Tirana — 2020–22
Dennis Dowouna — Skënderbeu — 2020–22
Randy Dwumfour — Skënderbeu — 2019–
Caleb Ekuban — Partizani — 2016–17
Joseph Ekuban — Partizani — 2019–20
Emmanuel Essien — Skënderbeu — 2019–20
Isaac Gyamfi — Tirana — 2020–22
Basit Abdul Khalid — Teuta — 2019–20
Alfred Mensah — Skënderbeu — 2019–
Emmanuel Mensah — Laçi, Partizani — 2016–17, 2018–19
Adamu Mohammed – Vllaznia (2008)
Fredrick Opoku — Bylis — 2019–20
Jordan Opoku – Dinamo Tirana (2011)
Derrick Sasraku — Tirana — 2020–21
Ibrahim Sulley — Tirana — 2020–21
Kwasi Sibo — Skënderbeu — 2018–19
Eric Warden — Luftëtari — 2018–19
Kofi Yeboah — Apolonia — 2020–21

Greece  

Donaldo Açka — Luftëtari — 2018–20
Dhimiter Andoni — Luftëtari — 2018–19
Georgios Antoniadis — Skënderbeu — 2021–
Christos Athanasopoulos — Luftëtari — 2017–18
Timis Bardis — Egnatia — 2021–22
Aristotel Bella — Luftëtari — 2018–19
Donald Bogdani — Skënderbeu — 2020–
Romario Çekaj — Luftëtari — 2018–19
Dionis Çikani — Partizani — 2020–21
Kostandino Dramolli — Skënderbeu, Bylis — 2013–16, 2019–21
Devid Fejzulla — Dinamo Tirana — 2021–
Apostol Furxhiu — Luftëtari — 2019–20
Damian Gjini — Laçi — 2019–20
Stivian Janku — Partizani, Luftëtari, Bylis — 2016–2018, 2019–21
Antonis Karabinas — Luftëtari — 2019–20
Dimitrios Kotsonis — Luftëtari — 2018–19
Alexandros Kouros — Teuta — 2019–21
Zani Kurti — Skënderbeu — 2018–19
Bruno Lulaj — Skënderbeu, Laçi, Kukësi — 2014–
Flosard Malçi —  Laçi, Bylis — 2019–20
Jorgo Meksi — Skënderbeu — 2019–
Ilias Melkas — Luftëtari — 2018–19
Alesio Mija — Dinamo Tirana — 2021–
Christos Mingas — Luftëtari — 2017–18
Bledi Muca — Luftëtari — 2019–20
Panagiotis Paiteris — Luftëtari — 2019–20
Paraskevas Prikas — Luftëtari — 2019–20
Harallamb Qaqi — Partizani, Laçi, Kukësi, Kamza, Skënderbeu, Teuta — 2015–19, 2020–
Andi Renja — Luftëtari — 2019–20
Simon Rrumbullaku — Kukësi — 2016–19
Georgios Sarris — Flamurtari — 2019–20
Petros Silidhis – Egnatia – 2021–
Vasil Shkurtaj — Luftëtari, Kukësi — 2017–20, 2021–
Renato Spahiu — Laçi, Bylis — 2019–20, 2020–21
Angelo Tafa — Kukësi — 2020–
Georgios Tampas — Skënderbeu — 2019–20
Alexandros Tereziou — Skënderbeu — 2020–21
Ardit Toli — Tirana — 2020–
Aleksandro Zaimaj — Laçi — 2019–
Renato Ziko — Skënderbeu, Laçi — 2018–19, 2021–
Vasilis Zogos —Bylis — 2019–20

Guinea  
Oumar Camara — Kukësi — 2019–20
Sekou Camara — Flamurtari, Teuta — 2017–19
Salim Cissé — Vllaznia — 2020–21
Lancinet Sidibe — Flamurtari, Teuta, Tirana, Dinamo Tirana — 2017–20, 2021–
Oumar Toure — Kukësi — 2018–19

Guinea-Bissau  
Amido Baldé — Kukësi — 2017–18
Idé Colubali — Teuta — 2019–20
Inzaghi – Kukësi (2013)

Hong Kong  
Remi Dujardin — Skënderbeu, Egnatia — 2020–22

Hungary  

Krisztián Adorján — Partizani — 2017–18
Zoltán Cipf – Partizani (2001–2002)
Zoltán Kenesei – Tirana (1999–2001), Partizani (2002)
Mátyás Lázár – Tirana (1999–2000)
Péter Sütöri – Tirana (1999–2000)
László Wukovics – Tirana (1999–2000)

Iran  
Nima Nakisa — Flamurtari — 1999–00
Reza Karimi — Skënderbeu, Teuta — 2016–19

Iraq  
Yousuf Zetuna — Kastrioti — 2021–

Israel  
Ben Azubel – Partizani (2016)
Siraj Nassar – Kukësi (2017)

Italy  
Alessio Abibi — Tirana, Kastrioti — 2017–19, 2020–21
Joseph Asante — Skënderbeu — 2021–22
Luca Bertoni – Partizani (2016)
Claudio Bonanni — Kamza — 2018–19
Gianmarco Campironi – Vllaznia (2014)
Irlian Ceka — Laçi — 2018–20
Michele Cima – Skënderbeu (2012)
Mauro Cioffi – Vllaznia (2014)
Godberg Cooper — Kukësi — 2019–21
Catello D´Apice — Dinamo Tirana — 2004–05
Giovanni La Camera – Partizani (2017–)
Entonjo Elezaj — Kukësi — 2020–21
Maurice Gomis — Kukësi — 2018–19
Alessio Hyseni — Flamurtari, Partizani, Bylis — 2016–21
Alessandro Kacbufi – Egnatia – 2021–
Emanuele Morini – Partizani (2015)
Luca Moscatiello – Teuta (2014)
Cristiano Muzzachi – Tirana (2005–2006)
Edoardo Pesciallo – Egnatia – 2021–
Francesco Pigoni – Tirana (2012–2013)
Matteo Prandelli – Kukësi (2013)
Andrea Selvaggio – Partizani (2017–)
Shaqir Tafa — Tirana — 2020–21

Ivory Coast  
Jocelin Behiratche — Tirana — 2020–
Aboubacar Camara — Partizani — 2021–

Jamaica  
Brian Brown — Partizani — 2019–21

Japan  

Masato Fukui — Tirana, Skënderbeu, Kukësi, Kamza — 2015–19
Masaki Iinuma — Flamurtari — 2016–17

Jordan  
Angelos Chanti — Luftëtari — 2019–20

Kenya  
Moses Arita — Tirana — 2011–12
Ismael Dunga — Luftëtari, Tirana, Vllaznia — 2018–21
Francis Kahata — Tirana — 2013–15
James Situma — Tirana — 2011–12

Kosovo  

Leonit Abazi — Skënderbeu — 2013–19
Berat Ahmeti – Vllaznia (2015–)
Liridon Ahmeti – Besa (2007), Teuta (2007–2009), Shkumbini (2011), Partizani (2014)
Malsor Ajeti — Skënderbeu — 2019–20
Almir Ajzeraj — Skënderbeu — 2018–20
Fidan Aliti – Skënderbeu 2017–19
Florent Avdyli — Teuta — 2018–
Ilir Avdyli — Tirana, Kamza, Kukësi – 2015–16, 2018–20
Shpëtim Babaj – Besa, Elbasani (2005–2007, 2007–2008)
Kreshnik Bahtiri — Kukësi — 2021–
Valon Bajgora – Besa (2006–2007)
Flamur Bajrami – Tirana (2016–)
Emin Baliqi – Besëlidhja, Elbasani (2007–2008, 2008)
Visar Bekaj — Tirana — 2020–
Albin Berisha — Laçi — 2018–19
Arjan Berisha – Partizani (2005–2006)
Bernard Berisha – Besa (2012–2014), Skënderbeu (2014–2015)
Ilir Berisha – Flamurtari (2016)
Elvis Bojaxhi – Kukësi (2014–)
Rron Broja — Partizani — 2019–21
Altin Bytyçi — Kukësi, Laçi — 2016–19, 2020–
Arbër Bytyqi — Laçi, Tirana — 2020–
Debatik Curri – Tirana (2014–2015), Flamurtari (2015–2016)
Dardan Çerkini – Flamurtari (2016)
Mirlind Daku — Kukësi — 2019–20
Armend Dallku – Besa (2004–2005)
David Domgjoni — Tirana, Kastrioti, Laçi — 2014–20
Lulzim Doshlaku – Bylis (2014)
Alban Dragusha – Besa (2006–2008; 2009–2010), Skënderbeu (2011)
Astrit Fazliu – Partizani (2014–2016), Flamurtari (2016–2017)
Ruhan Foniqi – Bylis (2013–2014)
Dren Gashi – Egnatia – 2021–22
Fisnik Gashi – Besa, Elbasani (2003–2005, 2006)
Roni Gashi — Teuta — 2018–20
Allush Gavazaj – Tirana (2014–), Tërbuni (2015–2016)
Zenel Gavazaj — Skënderbeu, Kukësi — 2018–19, 2020–
Drin Govori — Skënderbeu — 2020–21
Adnand Haliti – Partizani, Teuta (2005–2006, 2006–2007)
Ahmet Haliti – Besa (2014), Bylis (2015–2016)
Fitim Haliti – Besa (2008–2011)
Burim Hashani – Teuta (2007–2008)
Erdin Hashani – Besa, Besëlidhja (2006–2007, 2007–2008)
Adnan Haxhaj — Vllaznia — 2015–16
Yll Hoxha — Kukësi, Flamurtari, Vllaznia — 2012–17
Berat Hyseni – Tirana (2007–2008)
Labinot Ibrahimi — Partizani — 2013–19
Bujar Idrizi — Kukësi — 2017–18
Dritan Islamaj – Besa (2005–2006)
Ahmed Januzi – Besa (2006)
Bajram Jashanica — Skënderbeu, Besa — 2013–20
Armend Kastrati – Bylis (2014)
Shend Kelmendi — Skënderbeu — 2017–18
Besnik Krasniqi – Besa (2009–2011), Partizani (2013–2014), Teuta (2014), Flamurtari (2016–)
Dritan Krasniqi – Besa (2004–2011)
Festim Krasniqi – Partizani (2016)
Viktor Kuka – Teuta (2015)
Flamur Kyçyku – Flarmurtari (2006–2008)
Mensur Limani — Tirana — 2012–14
Lapidar Lladrovci — Kukësi — 2015–16
Riza Lushta — Tirana — 1934–39
Kreshnik Lushtaku — Vllaznia — 2015–16
Kushtrim Lushtaku — Kukësi, Flamurtari — 2014–17
Esat Mala — Partizani — 2019–
Argjend Malaj — Tirana, Skënderbeu, Kamza — 2014–19
Behar Maliqi – Partizani (2013–2014)
Faton Maloku — Kukësi — 2018–19
Lorik Maxhuni – Flamurtari (2015–)
Mentor Mazrekaj – Partizani, Laçi — 2013–17, 2020–
Lirim Mema — Flamurtari — 2019–20
Shkodran Metaj – Flamurtari (2014–2015)
Xhelal Miroçi – Vllaznia (2006–2007)
Arbnor Muja — Skënderbeu — 2019–21
Premton Muja – Elbasani (2006–2007)
Ismet Munishi – Flarmurtari, Laçi, Besa – 1995–1996, 2003–2004, 2005, 2005–2007
Kushtrim Munishi – Partizani (1995–1997)
Drilon Musaj – Laçi (2015–2017)
Kushtrim Mushica – Bylis (2015)
Besar Musolli — Kukësi — 2012–20
Argjend Mustafa – Skënderbeu (2016–)
Argjend Mustafa — Besa, Partizani, Laçi, Tirana, Flamurtari — 2012–20
Ilir Nallbani – Elbasani (2006–2008), Vllaznia (2008–2013)
Kreshnik Nebihiu — Flamurtari, Bylis — 2019–20, 2020–21
Dijar Nikqi — Tirana — 2021–
Adis Nurković — Flamurtari — 2017–18
Leutrim Pajaziti – Teuta (2012–2013)
Fisnik Papuqi – Elbasani (2006–2008)
Avni Pepa – Flamurtari (2015)
Arsim Plepolli – Elbasani (2007–2008)
Jeton Qerimi – Teuta (2005–2006)
Fisnik Ramadanaj – Besa (2013–2014)
Ylber Ramadani – Partizani (2016–2017)
Valdrin Rashica – Skënderbeu (2016), Teuta (2016–2017)
Alban Rexhepi – Laçi (2015)
Amir Rrahmani – Partizani (2013–2015)
Leard Sadriu — Skënderbeu — 2020–
Samir Sahiti – Skënderbeu (2014), Bylis (2016)
Suad Sahiti — Skënderbeu — 2017–18
Hajdin Salihu – Laçi – 2021–22
Florent Sejdiu – Skënderbeu (2014)
Alban Shabani — Skënderbeu — 2020–21
Bujar Shabani – Skënderbeu (2015)
Veton Shabani – Korabi (2017)
Xhevdet Shabani – Teuta (2014)
Sedat Shahini – Teuta (2005–2006)
Arb Shala — Dinamo Tirana — 2021–
Arbër Shala — Laçi, Kamza — 2016–19
Alban Shillova – Bylis (2014)
Meriton Spahiu – Lushnja (2005–2006)
Rron Statovci — Partizani — 2018–19
Erkan Sulejmani – Vllaznia (2007–2008), Kastrioti (2005–2006)
Gjelbrim Taipi — Kukësi — 2020–
Faton Toski – Laçi (2016)
Mendurim Ulluri – Teuta (2014)
Besart Veseli – Elbasani (2015)
Leonat Vitija — Skënderbeu — 2019–
Ymer Xhaferri – Besa (2005–2006)

Latvia  
Romans Bezzubovs — Bylis — 2010–11
Artūrs Silagailis — Tirana — 2010–11

Lebanon  
Mohammad Kdouh – Vllaznia (2015)

Liberia  
Abel Gebor – Tërbuni (2015)
Van-Dave Harmon – Laçi — 2020–

Lithuania  
Rolandas Baravykas — Kukësi — 2020–21

Mali  

Moctar Cissé – Tirana (2016–2017)
Saliou Guindo — Skënderbeu, Bylis, Laçi — 2018–20, 2021–
Ibrahima Kone – Dinamo Tirana (2005–2006)
Bakary Nimaga — Skënderbeu — (2012–18
Ali Samake — Dinamo Tirana — 2021–
Djibril Sissoko – Lushnja (2004-2006), Flamurtari (2006–2007), Lushnja (2008–2009)
Abdoulaye Toungara — Flamurtari — 2017–19
Abdulla Traoré – Kastrioti (2007–2008)

Martinique  
Bedi Buval – Flamurtari (2015)

Mauritania  
Mohamed Hamrud — Tirana — 2001–02

Mexico  
David Izazola — Kamza — 2018–19
Jorge Oropeza — Flamurtari — 2007–08

Moldova  

Maxim Cojocaru — Vllaznia — 2019–20
Artiom Puntus — Kukësi — 2021–
Eugen Sidorenco — Vllaznia — 2019–20
Dmitri Stajila — Kukësi, Laçi — 2014–15, 2019–20

Montenegro  
Jasmin Agović — Vllaznia — 2016–17
Savo Barac – Vllaznia (2001–2003)
Aleksandar Bezmarević – Teuta (2014)
Drago Bumbar — Apolonia — 2020–21
Darko Bulatović — Vllaznia — 2021–
Valjento Camaj – Vllaznia (2000–2001)
Stefan Cicmil — Vllaznia — 2015–17
Marko Ćetković – Laçi (2014–2016), Partizani (2017)
Igor Ćuković — Kamza — 2017–19
Ivan Delić – Vllaznia (2012–2013), Tirana (2014)
Andrija Dragojević — Vllaznia — 2015–16
Jovan Drobnjak – Partizani (2005), Vllaznia (2006)
Đorđe Đikanović – Kukësi (2015)
Enis Đoković – Vllaznia (2011–2013)
Hasim Đoković – Vllaznia (2000–2001, 2002–2003)
Simo Goranović – Besa (2013)
Branimir Ivanišević – Dinamo Tirana (2005–2007)
Miloš Kalezić — Vllaznia — 2020–21
Aleksandar Kovač – Teuta (2005–2007)
Alija Krnić — Kukësi — 2021–
Miloš Marković – Skënderbeu (2012–2013)
Dražen Milić – Vllaznia (2006–2007)
Darko Nikač — Teuta — 2019–20
Baćo Nikolić – Flamurtari (2015)
Jovan Nikolić – Partizani (2015)
Stefan Nikolić — Partizani — 2018–19
Darko Pavićević – Vllaznia (2015)
Ranko Radonjić – Vllaznia (2005)
Balša Radović — Flamurtari, Luftëtari — 2016–17, 2018–19
Blažo Rajović – Vllaznia (2009–2011, 2013–2014), Flamurtari (2011–2013), Laçi (2017)
Igor Radusinović – Vllaznia (2005–2007)
Marko Roganović – Laçi – 2021–
Ognjen Rolović — Kamza — 2018–19
Adrijan Rudović – Tërbuni (2015–2016)
Ronaldo Rudović – Vllaznia (2016–)
Marko Šćepanović – Kukësi (2016)
Aleksandar Šofranac — Dinamo Tirana — 2021–
Idriz Toskić — Skënderbeu — 2018–19
Marko Vidović – Partizani (2015–2016)
Miroslav Vujadinović – Vllaznia (2010–2014), Laçi (2014–2016), Korabi (2016–2017)
Goran Vujović – Skënderbeu (2017)
Nikola Vukčević – Vllaznia (2006–2007, 2014)
Dejan Zarubica – Laçi – 2021–
Miodrag Zec – Tirana (2012)
Bojan Zogović — Vllaznia — 2020–

Morocco  
Omar Gasnayt – Lushnja (2004–2005)
Muhamet Zadrah – Lushnja (2004–2005)

Mozambique  
Faisal Bangal – Teuta (2016–2017)
Ussama Mutumane – Luftëtari (2017–)
Reginaldo — Luftëtari, Laçi, Kukësi, Dinamo Tirana — 2016–19, 2021–

Netherlands  
Cerezo Hilgen – Luftëtari — 2019–20
Arsenio Valpoort – Teuta, Egnatia – 2021–22
Jan Veenhof – Tirana — 2002–03
Angelmo Vyent – Luftëtari — 2019–20

Nigeria  

Sulaimon Adekunle – Apolonia (2012–2015), Bylis (2015)
Abraham Adelaja – Korabi (2016–2017)
James Adeniyi — Bylis, Tomori, Laçi, Skënderbeu — 2012–18
Ismail Gata Adeshina – Kukësi (2014)
Rasak Ridwan Adeshina – Skënderbeu (2016–)
Adebayo Adigun – Bylis (2012–2013)
Ovbokha Agboyi – Elbasani (2014–2015)
Adeleke Akinyemi — Skënderbeu, Laçi — 2015–16, 2021–
Abraham Alechenwu – Elbasani (2005–2006), Tirana (2006–2010), Dinamo Tirana (2007–2008), Vllaznia (2011), Flamurtari (2011–2012), Besa (2012–2013), Kastrioti (2013–2014), Laçi (2016–)
Morrise Anayo – Apolonia (2012–2013)
Beji Anthony — Bylis — 2019–
Sodiq Atanda — Apolonia, Partizani — 2012–13, 2014–2019
Prince Guy Ativie – Partizani (2002–2003)
Gabriel Awia – Skënderbeu (2005–2006), Kastrioti (2006–2007), Apolonia (2007)
Eko Barine – Skënderbeu (2016–), Teuta (2017)
Olalekan Bola – Bylis (2012–2013)
Mathew Boniface – Partizani (2017)
Stephen Chinedu — Dinamo Tirana — 2021–
Geoffrey Chinedu Charles – Skënderbeu (2016–)
Medu Dixon – Egnatia (2004–2005)
John Eboh – Lushnja (2005–2006)
Kufre Ebong – Kukësi (2017–)
Ifeanyi Edeh – Tirana (2016–)
Ndubuisi Egbo – Tirana (2001–2004), Bylis (2008–2009)
Mesheli Eimen – Tirana (2001–2002)
Christopher Omoseibi Elijah – Bylis (2013)
Henry Emenalo – Apolonia (2006–2007)
Patrick Friday Eze — Kukësi — 2020–21
Emanuel Ezeriaha – Besa (2005–2006)
Collins Eziamaka – Vllaznia (2018–2019)
Aondongu John Huan – Bylis (2012–2013)
Lukman Hussein — Kastrioti — 2018–19, 2020–
Michael Ebere Ikpe – Bylis (2013–2014)
Abdullahi Ishaka – Besa (2003–2004), Shkumbini (2004–2005), Besa (2005–2006), Partizani (2006), Elbasani (2006–2007), Besa (2007–2008)
Solomonson Izuchukwuka – Bylis (2011–2013, 2016), Kukësi (2014)
Otto John — Skënderbeu — 2018–20
Ikechukwu Kalu – Teuta (2014)
Qudus Lawal — Bylis — 2020–21
Tochukwu Nabukwane – Shkumbini (2005–2006), Vllaznia (2005–2006), Besëlidhja (2007–2008)
Leonardo Ineh Nosa – Lushnja (1996–1997)
Odirah Ntephe — Bylis — 2019–
Erhun Obanor — Kukësi, Laçi — 2019–21
Nnamdi Oduamadi – Tirana (2018–2019)
Charles Ofoyen – Apolonia (2006–2011), Tomori (2012–2013), Laçi (2013–2014)
Ambrose Ohadero – Lushnja (2005–2006)
Henry Okebugwu — Partizani, Kastrioti — 2018–19, 2020–
Martins Okeke – Apolonia (2001–2003)
Anthony Okpotu — Laçi — 2018–19
Samuel Okunowo – Tirana (2004–2005)
Emejuru Okwudili – Shkumbini (2007–2008)
Samuel Olabisi – Kukësi (2014)
Oshobe Oladele – Partizani (2013–2014)
Peter Taiye Oladotun – Kamza (2011)
Joseph Olatunji – Skënderbeu (2011)
Peter Olayinka – Bylis (2012–2013), Skënderbeu (2014–2015)
Sunday Ominiu – Partizani (2002–2003)
Olawale Onanuga — Kastrioti — 2021–
Valentin Onieka – Shkumbini (2005–2006)
Ebus Onuchukwu – Apolonia (2005–2006)
Benjamin Onwuachi – Tirana (2007–2008)
Nurudeen Orelesi — Dinamo Tirana, Skënderbeu, Kamza — 2010–14, 2015–19
James Osusi – Laçi (2004–2005), Skënderbeu (2005–2006), Kastrioti (2006–2009)
Kehinde Owoeye – Bylis (2012–2013), Tomori (2013), Laçi (2014), Kastrioti (2014–2015)
Theophilus Solomon — Partizani — 2019–21
Peter Suswam – Kukësi (2014)
Gilbert Omatseyin Thompson – Apolonia (2014)
Henry Uche – Kukësi (2014)
Charles Udeke – Kastrioti (2007–2008)
Felix Udoh – Partizani (2013–2014)
Alma Wakili — Partizani — 2018–19

North Korea  
So Hyon-uk — Partizani — 2018–19

North Macedonia  

Besart Abdurahimi — Partizani — 2017–18
Ilirid Ademi – Laçi, Egnatia – 2021–
Mevlan Adili — Vllaznia — 2019–
Eftim Aksentiev – Skënderbeu (2010)
Marjan Altiparmakovski — Laçi — 2018–19
Bashkim Arifi – Elbasani (2002–2003)
Jasir Asani — Partizani — 2017–21
Erogen Brajković–Vaso – Erzeni (2001–2003), Vllaznia (2003–2005)
Elvis Bajrami – Apolonia (2006–2007)
Egzon Belica — Partizani — 2018–
Sedat Berisha — Vllaznia, Tirana — 2017–19
Amir Bilali — Bylis, Teuta, Partizani — 2015–16, 2017–18, 2019–20
Ilčo Borov – Apolonia (2001–2002)
Bobi Celeski — Teuta — 2018–22
Ardian Cuculi — Partizani, Kukësi — 2014–15, 2018–19
Aleksandar Damchevski — Partizani — 2021–
Cvete Delioski – Apolonia (2006–2008), Shkumbini (2008–2009)
Besir Demiri — Kukësi, Dinamo Tirana — 2020–
Ertan Demiri – Partizani (2013–2014)
Milan Dimitrievski – Dinamo Tirana (2005–2006)
Dejan Dimitrovski – Besëlidhja (2007–2008)
Kirče Dimovski – Apolonia (2006–2007)
Hristijan Dragarski – Teuta – 2021–22
Filip Duranski – Egnatia – 2021–
Andreja Efremov — Vllaznia — 2019–20
Muzafer Ejupi – Skënderbeu (2013)
Agon Elezi — Skënderbeu — 2019–20
Valon Ethemi — Kukësi — 2017–20
Besnik Ferati — Partizani — 2019–21
Imran Fetai — Apolonia — 2020–21
Argjent Gafuri — Flamurtari — 2017–18
Gilson – Besëlidhja (2008)
Sašo Gjoreski – Tirana (2007–2008)
Bojan Gjorgievski — Teuta — 2017–19
Fahrudin Gjurgjevikj — Vllaznia — 2021–
Filip Gligorov — Vllaznia, Partizani, Kukësi — 2019–20, 2021–
Pepi Gorgiev – Teuta – 2021–22
Ferhan Hasani — Partizani — 2020–21
Simeon Hristov — Vllaznia — 2019–20
Agim Ibraimi — Kukësi, Dinamo Tirana — 2020–
Mensur Idrizi – Elbasani (2010), Skënderbeu (2011), Pogradeci (2012)
Riste Ilijovski — Luftëtari — 2018–19
Demir Imeri — Kamza, Vllaznia, Egnatia — 2017–18, 2020–
Aleksandar Isaevski — Vllaznia, Dinamo Tirana — 2020–
Besar Iseni – Egnatia – 2021–
Aleksandar Jakimovski – Apolonia (2007), Shkumbini (2007–2008)
Armend Jusufi – Besëlidhja (2007–2008)
Fatjon Jusufi — Partizani — 2018–19
Florian Kadriu – Tirana (2015–2016), Teuta (2016)
Dimitar Kapinkovski – Bylis (2009)
Nikola Karčev – Elbasani (2007, 2008–2010)
Tome Kitanovski — Kukësi — 2019–20
Pece Korunovski – Tirana (2009–2010)
Dejan Kostevski – Besëlidhja (2007–2008)
Besart Krivanjeva – Egnatia – 2021–
Vlade Lazarevski – Flamurtari (2013)
Nijaz Lena – Flamurtari (2010–2015), Teuta (2016), Kukësi (2016–)
Edis Maliki — Kukësi, Dinamo Tirana — 2018–20, 2021–
Toni Meglenski – Elbasani (2008, 2009–2010)
Raif Mircelovski – Bylis (2008–2009)
Muarem Muarem — Flamurtari — 2017–18
Mevlan Murati – Partizani (2014–2015)
Burhan Mustafov — Teuta — 2017–18
Valmir Nafiu – Skënderbeu (2016)
Bojan Najdenov — Laçi — 2018–19
Filip Najdovski — Tirana — 2020–
Kliment Nastoski – Pogradeci (2011), Shkumbini (2012)
Nderim Nexhipi – Partizani (2014–2015), Flamurtari (2015), Korabi (2016)
Arbën Nuhiji – Besa (2006–2007), Elbasani (2008)
Ardijan Nuhiji – Dinamo Tirana (2006–2007), Elbasani (2007–2008)
Borjan Pančevski — Bylis — 2020–21
Dragan Pernjačevski – Besëlidhja (2007–2008)
Ilče Petrovski – Pogradeci (2011–2012), Kastrioti (2013)
Artim Položani — Apolonia, Dinamo Tirana, Partizani, Flamurtari, Skënderbeu — 2000–04, 2007–08, 2017–20
Aleksandar Popovski – Apolonia (2008)
Emran Ramadani — Partizani — 2017–18
Zekirija Ramadan – Besa (2007–2008)
Bekim Redjepi — Skënderbeu — 2020–
Aleksandar Ristevski — Vllaznia — 2019–20
Kire Ristevski – Elbasani (2010), Bylis (2011–2013), Tirana (2015)
Borče Ristovski – Skënderbeu (2010)
Panče Ristovski – Apolonia (2006–2007)
Ersen Sali – Partizani (2014)
Taulant Seferi — Tirana, Teuta — 2020–
Bunjamin Shabani – Partizani (2014–2015)
Artim Shaqiri – Besa (2007–2008)
Goran Siljanovski — Flamurtari, Dinamo Tirana — 2017–19, 2021–
Igor Stojanov – Elbasani (2006)
Ilčo Stojčevski – Besëlidhja (2007–2008)
Aco Stojkov – Skënderbeu (2015)
Alban Sulejmani — Partizani — 2017–18
Flamur Tairi – Teuta (2010–2013), Bylis (2015–2016)
Ilčo Tasev – Besëlidhja (2007–2008)
Blagoja Todorovski — Teuta — 2019–
Aleksander Tolevski – Besëlidhja (2007–2008)
Kristijan Toshevski — Tirana — 2020–
Ennur Totre — Tirana — 2021–
Yani Urdinov – Flamurtari (2015)
Muhamed Useini — Flamurtari — 2017–19
Bashkim Velija – Laçi – 2021–
Bilal Velija – Besa (2008–2009)
Viktor Velkoski – Laçi – 2021–
Suat Zendeli – Dinamo Tirana (2002–2003, 2005–2006), Apolonia (2006–2007), Besa (2007–2009)
Fisnik Zuka — Flamurtari — 2017–18

Norway  
Loti Celina — Partizani — 2020–

Palestine  
Mohammad Al-Kayed — Skënderbeu — 2017–19

Paraguay  
Santiago Martinez – Vllaznia (2015)
Ángel Orué – Skënderbeu (2016)

Peru  
Juan Carlos Mariño – Dinamo Tirana (2005–2006)

Poland  
Przemysław Norko – Partizani (2005–2006)

Portugal  
Pedro Neves – Bylis (2008–2009)
Fernando Pina – Skënderbeu (2007–2008)
Ruben Silva — Kastrioti — 2021–22

Romania  
Lucian Bica – Dinamo Tirana (2002–2003), Lushnja (2003–2005)
Deian Boldor — Partizani — 2019–20
Gheorghe Cornea – Lushnja (2003–2004)
Christian Dragoi – Kastrioti (2012), Vllaznia (2012–2013), Kukësi (2013)
Adrian John Ene – Lushnja (2003–2004)
Dan Ignat – Vllaznia (2018–2019)
Cornel Predescu – Skënderbeu (2017)
Cristian Sîrghi — Flamurtari — 2018–19

Russia  
Vladimir Esin — Luftëtari — 2018–19
Khasan Khatsukov — Kamza — 2017–19
Dmitri Simonov — Kamza — 2017–19

Rwanda  
Lewis Aniweta – Skënderbeu (2005)
Meddie Kagere – Tirana (2014)

Senegal  

Timothe Benisson – Besa (2005–2006)
Amadou Boiro — Laçi — 2017–18
Fallou Diagne — Vllaznia — 2021–
Abdoulaye Diop – Egnatia (2004–2005)
Albaye Papa Diop – Dinamo Tirana, Shkumbini — 2005–10, 2011–12
Ismaila Diop — Apolonia — 2020–21
Moctar Fall  – Teuta (2014)
Pape Niokhor Fall – Dinamo Tirana (2005–2006)
Baptiste Faye – Luftëtari (2016)
El Hadji Gaye – Dinamo Tirana (2004–2005)
Masseye Gaye – Dinamo Tirana (2005–2006)
El Hadji Goudjabi – Dinamo Tirana, Vllaznia, Skënderbeu (2005–2008)
Nuke Gutenberg – Partizani (2004–2005)
Maguette Gueye — Partizani — 2021–
Abdoulaye Khouma Keita – Dinamo Tirana (2003–2004)
Malick Mané — Laçi — 2018–19
Jean Ndecky — Skënderbeu — 2019–20
Amadou Samb  – Teuta (2014)
Saliou Sembene — Partizani — 2021–
Paul Sene – Dinamo Tirana, Teuta (2003–2005)
Mamadou Sissoko – Besa (2005–2006)
Albrahim Tamakara – Egnatia (2004–2005)
Boubacar Traorè — Teuta — 2018–19

Serbia  

Dragan Antanasijević – Partizani (2014)
Elmir Asani — Skënderbeu — 2018–19
Nikola Ašćerić – Kastrioti (2012)
Almir Bejktović – Bylis (2010)
Petar Borovićanin – Kastrioti (2012)
Mladen Brkić – Apolonia (2008–2010), Dinamo Tirana (2009, 2011), Skënderbeu (2010), Flamurtari (2011), Laçi (2013–2014)
Vladimir Buač – Partizani (2013)
Vilson Caković – Apolonia (2013, 2014–2015)
Tarik Čmajčanin – Teuta (2016–2017)
Milan Ćulum — Partizani — 2017–18
Pavle Delibašić – Teuta (2012)
Aleksandar Desančić — Bylis — 2020–21
Ivan Disić – Bylis (2009)
Đorđe Đorđević – Apolonia (2014–2015)
Nikola Đurić – Flamurtari (2016–2017)
Uroš Đurić – Egnatia – 2021–22
Faton Džemaili — Kukësi, Skënderbeu — 2018–20
Altin Grbović – Shkumbini (2010–2011), Skënderbeu (2011)
Ivan Gvozdenović – Tirana (2010–2011), Skënderbeu (2011–2014), Kukësi (2014–2015)
Semin Hadžibulić – Teuta (2017–)
Aleksandar Ignjatović — Laçi — 2019–
Filip Ivanović – Teuta – 2021–
Ivan Jakovljević — Flamurtari, Luftëtari — 2016–19
Đuro Jandrić – Elbasani (2011)
Vladimir Jašić – Vllaznia (2010–2011)
Miloš Jevđević – Apolonia (2010–2011), Kukësi (2012–2013)
Marko Jovanović – Vllaznia (2010), Bylis (2011)
Milan Jovanović – Tirana (2013)
Dejan Karan – Tirana (2015–2016)
Nemanja Kojić — Bylis — 2020–21
Nemanja Lazić – Kastrioti (2012)
Slavko Lukić – Teuta (2015–2016), Flamurtari (2016)
Bojan Malinić – Besa (2012–2013)
Ersin Mehmedović – Vllaznia (2014)
Borko Milenković – Laçi (2011–2013), Tërbuni (2015–2016)
Aleksandar Milić – Luftëtari (2012)
Marko Milivojević – Skënderbeu (2012), Luftëtari (2013)
Vladan Milosavljev — Luftëtari — 2018–19
Milovan Milović – Dinamo Tirana (2011)
Luka Milunović — Kukësi — 2021–
Predrag Mirčeta – Apolonia (2008–2009)
Milan Mirosavljev — Partizani — 2021–
Goran Mirović – Apolonia (2010)
Danijel Morariju – Lushnja (2013)
Petar Mudreša – Apolonia (2010)
Edin Mujković – Vllaznia (2014)
Igor Nedeljković — Flamurtari — 2017–18
Marko Nestorović – Skënderbeu (2010)
Danilo Nikolić – Dinamo Tirana (2008–2009)
Milan Nikolić – Luftëtari (2011–2012), Vllaznia (2014)
Ivan Perić – Kukësi (2014)
Dušan Popović – Bylis (2010–2012), Apolonia (2012)
Lazar Popović – Kukësi (2012–2013), Kastrioti (2014)
Vasilije Prodanović – Kastrioti (2012)
Marko Putinčanin – Dinamo Tirana (2009–2011)
Stevan Račić — Partizani, Kamza — 2014–16, 2017–18
Kenan Ragipović – Apolonia (2009–2010), Kastrioti (2010–2011)
Marko Rajković – Apolonia (2014–2015)
Miroslav Rikanović – Elbasani (2011)
Miloš Rnić – Flamurtari (2016–2017)
Damir Rovčanin – Laçi (2013)
Vladimir Savićević – Pogradeci (2011)
Borislav Simić – Bylis (2015–2016)
Goran Simov – Bylis (2010)
Aleksandar Srećković – Apolonia (2008–2009)
Filip Stojanović – Kastrioti (2011)
Miloš Stojanović — Bylis — 2020–
Shqiprim Taipi — Kukësi — 2018–
Aleksandar Tasić – Tërbuni (2016)
Vukašin Tomić – Flamurtari (2015)
Dragan Trajković – Laçi (2011–2012)
Dragan Ugrenović — Besëlidhja — 2006–07
Nikola Vasilić — Elbasani — 2010–11
Dragan Vranić — Elbasani — 2007–08
Branislav Vukomanović — Kastrioti — 2011–12
Ilaz Zylfiu — Laçi — 2020–

Slovenia  

Patrik Bordon — Partizani, Bylis — 2013–14
Darijo Biščan — Bylis — 2010–11
Darko Djukić — Flamurtari — 2009–10
Dejan Grabič — Skënderbeu — 2010–11
Liridon Osmanaj — Partizani — 2014–15
Almir Sulejmanovič — Elbasani, Skënderbeu — 2010–12
Dalibor Volaš — Partizani — 2016–17

Spain  
Pablo de Lucas — Kukësi — 2021–
Ángel Pindado — Kastrioti — 2013–14
Eloy Robles — Skënderbeu — 2011–12
Albert Serrán — Kukësi — 2017–18
Mamadou Tounkara — Flamurtari — 2017–18

Sweden  
Alban Jusufi — Vllaznia — 2007–08
Egzon Sekiraça — Skënderbeu — 2017–19
Mergim Shala — Skënderbeu — 2020–21

Sudan  
Alexandros Abdel Rahim — Kastrioti, Skënderbeu — 2018–19, 2020–21

Switzerland  
Albion Avdijaj — Skënderbeu, Vllaznia — 2020–21
Lavdrim Ebipi — Kukësi — 2017–18
Jeton Jakupi — Teuta — 2005–06
Beli Muriqi — Skënderbeu — 2019–
Anis Mrsic — Dinamo Tirana — 2021–
Albin Sadrijaj — Vllaznia — 2021–22
Nezbedin Selimi — Laçi, Flamurtari — 2010–12
Rijat Shala — Teuta, Vllaznia — 2013–15
Sadik Vitija — Kukësi — 2020–21

Togo  
Elom Nya-Vedji — Vllaznia — 2020–21

Turkey  
Servet Teufik Agaj — Skënderbeu — 1932–38
Nusret Basic — Vllaznia — 2001–02

Uganda  
Tony Mawejje — Tirana — 2018–19
Francis Olaki — Tirana — 2014–15
Yunus Sentamu — Tirana — 2018–19
Godfrey Walusimbi — Vllaznia — 2019–20

Ukraine  
Serhiy Romanishyn — Dinamo Tirana, Vllaznia, Besa, Shkumbini — 1999–04, 2005–07

United States  

Thomas Culver — Apolonia — 2012–13
Dilly Duka — Partizani — 2018–19
Bryan Joel Rodriguez — Laçi — 2020–21
Dembakwi Yomba — Laçi — 2019–20
Kyrian Nwabueze — Laçi — 2019–21

Uruguay  
Giorginho Aguirre — Vllaznia — 2014–15
Emiliano Mozzone — Bylis — 2019–20
Ignacio Nicolini — Flamurtari — 2015–16
Sebastián Sosa — Vllaznia — 2014–16
Bruno Toledo — Luftëtari — 2017–18

Venezuela 
Jorge Francisco Casanova — Elbasani — 2008–09
Aristóteles Romero — Partizani — 2019–20

Zambia 
Charles Chilufya — Shkumbini — 2002–03
Edward Kangwa — Partizani — 2005–06
January Zyambo — Bylis, Dinamo Tirana, Vllaznia, Teuta, Kastrioti, Laçi, Kamza — 2002–2010, 2011–12

Zimbabwe 

Noel Kaseke — Erzeni — 2002–03
Nkosilathi Khumalo — Bylis, Teuta — 2002–04
Thabathi Masawi — Erzeni — 2002–03

References

Notes

External links
Kategoria Superiore at National-Football-Teams.com

Kategoria Superiore players
Albania
Expatriate footballers in Albania
Association football player non-biographical articles